The Wellsville Local School District is a public school district serving the Wellsville area in southeastern Columbiana County in the U.S. state of Ohio.

Wellsville Jr./Sr. High School is the only high school in the district.  The schools' sports teams are known as the Tigers, formerly the Bengals. Correspondingly, the colors are orange and black.

Schools currently in operation by the school district

Historic schools no longer in operation by the school district

Timeline

References

https://reportcard.education.ohio.gov/district/detail/045039

http://images.pcmac.org/Uploads/WellsvilleLocal/WellsvilleLocal/Sites/News/Documents/Wellsville_Schools_History.pdf

http://www.oldohioschools.com/columbiana_county.htm

Education in Columbiana County, Ohio
School districts in Ohio
Public schools in Ohio